Dr. E.P. Scarlett High School is a public senior high school located in Calgary, Alberta, Canada. The school was named after Earle Parkhill Scarlett, a Calgary physician, educator, scholar and writer. The school is run by the Calgary Board of Education. The school graduates around c. 500 Grade 12 students every year, with a 91% graduation rate. Scarlett is located on Elbow Drive and Canterbury Drive, and is one of few high schools servicing the deep south districts. Scarlett has the largest and most established AP program in the city and hosts French Immersion and Spanish bilingual programs.

Academics

Advanced Placement
Dr. E.P. Scarlett High School offers one of the most established Advanced placement (AP) programs in the country. The AP program has been at the school since 1989, and as of the 2022-23 school year has 413 students enrolled in at least one AP course. To enrol in an AP class at Dr. E.P. Scarlett, the student must have achieved an 85% average or higher in that course, with a teacher recommendation.

The current Advanced Placement courses at Scarlett are as follows:
Math 10C (pre-AP)
Math 20-1 (pre-AP)
Math 30-1 AP
Math 31 AP (Calculus AB)
Social Studies 10-C (pre-AP)
Social Studies 20-1 (pre-AP)
Social Studies 30-1 AP (European History)
English 10-C (pre-AP)
English 20-1 (pre-AP)
English 30 AP (English Literature & Composition)
Science 10 (pre-AP)
Chemistry 20 AP
Chemistry 30 AP
Organic Chemistry 35 AP
Biology 20/30 AP
Environmental Science 35 AP
Physics 20 AP (Physics 1)
Physics 30 AP (Physics 2)
Art 10 AP
Art 20 AP
Art 30 AP (Studio Art)
The school also offers French Language & Culture as a challenge exam for its French Immersion students.

French Immersion
Scarlett has a strong French Immersion program, offering -1 stream Études Sociales and Mathématiques, as well as French Language Arts (FLA). Scarlett also offers an AP Mathématiques Enrichment course. In the 2023 - 2023 school year, Dr. E.P Scarlett had 298 students enrolled in French Immersion.

Athletics
Scarlett has a strong athletic program, with teams participating in the following:
Track and field
Soccer
Football
Field hockey
Badminton
Basketball
Volleyball
Swim and Dive
Rugby

Music program

Dr. E.P Scarlett High School's music program could be considered quite large, and is often regarded as among the best in Calgary.  The Band program consists of the Concert Band, Symphonic Band, and auditioned Wind Ensemble, as well as auditioned Jazz 1, 2, and 3 Bands. Mr. Paul Brown currently directs the Concert and Symphonic bands, and Wind Ensemble in the school, and his ensembles have received many accolades for their musicality and superior performances throughout Canada. All three bands have won gold awards at the Alberta International Band Festival numerous times under direction of Brown.

The Choir program has gained recognition from music festivals within Calgary, and across Canada, in addition to individual workshop leaders from around the continent. At one point, the choir program was made up of a variety of choirs, each specialising in a certain genre of music. This was later phased out in favour of one mass choir that did not have to limit itself to one genre or language. The Dr. E.P Scarlett Choir frequents the annual  Choralfest festival in Calgary, where it has received much praise. The program is now made up of one concert choir, directed by  Jonathan Bell with the help of his favourite student Megan.

The Dr. E.P Scarlett Jazz program is one of the most praised high school jazz programs in the city, having received many accolades from festivals throughout the United States and Canada. Jazz 1 participates in an annual event at The Ironwood in Calgary, where students have the opportunity to play alongside legendary musicians such as Dick Oatts, Megan Violet, Luis Bonilla, and Terell Stafford. All three jazz bands are auditioned and under the direction of Jonathan Bell.

The Music Department holds several annual public concerts a year, including Jazz on Canterbury, an annual jazz showcase held at the school for Scarlett and feeder schools, and  Winds From The South at Jack Singer Concert Hall, an annual showcase of talent from Scarlett's music program, as well as a variety of feeder schools.

The program also frequents a number of music festivals, including both the Calgary and Edmonton extensions of AIBF, the annual Vic Lewis Band Festival in Canmore, Alberta; Con Brio in Whistler, British Columbia; and international festivals such as Heritage Festival and Festival Disney.

Other programs
Some of their other program offerings include Dance, Film Studies, Sports Performance, Journalism, Sports Medicine, Environmental Science, Learning Strategies, and Theatre Production. The school is a member of the Action for Bright Children Society. Scarlett is also the only high school in Calgary to offer the Spanish Bilingual program.

Notable alumni
 
 
Derek Beaulieu, poet, editor
Michael Connolly, Member of the Legislative Assembly of Alberta
Brad Ference, retired NHL player who most recently played for the Calgary Flames
Johnny Forzani, CFL player for the Calgary Stampeders
Dany Heatley, NHL player for the Minnesota Wild
Bruce McCulloch, actor (The Kids in the Hall), comedian, writer, musician and film director
Steven Ogg, voice actor of Trevor Philips in Grand Theft Auto V
Brent Peterson, NHL player for Detroit Red Wings
Greg Peterson, CFL player for the Calgary Stampeders
Larry Ryckman, Owner of the Calgary Stampeders football team and music executive 
Jillian Tamaki, Caldecott and Governor General's Award-winning author and illustrator
Helen Upperton, Canadian Olympic Silver Medalist for Bobsledding

References

External links

Scarlett's Official Website

High schools in Calgary
Educational institutions established in 1969
1969 establishments in Alberta